The Municipal Borough of Llanelly was an urban district in Carmarthenshire between 1894 and 1913 when it received full borough status.

1894 election
The first election was held in December 1894.

Ward One

Ward Two

Ward Three

1896 election
At the second election in March 1896, only one ward was contested. One of the sitting members was defeated.

Ward One

Ward Two

Ward Three

1897 election
The third election was held in April 1897 and three of the retiring members lost their seats. In Ward 3 it was suggested that denominational factors played a part as the two successful candidates were Baptists while he defeated candidates were Congregationalists.

Ward One

Ward Two

Ward Three

1898 election
At the fourth election in April 1898, only one ward was contested as had happened two years previously. In Ward 3, David Thomas narrowly failed to regain the seat he lost the previous year.

Ward One

Ward Two

Ward Three

1899 election
At the fifth election in March 1899, only one Ward 2, where the two sitting members stood down, was contested. The result in Ward 2 was decisive.

Ward One

Ward Two

Ward Three

1900 election
The sixth election was held in April 1900 with two of the three seats being contested. The local Trades and Labour Council ran a candidate, successfully, in Ward 2, although the candidacy was strongly opposed by the Llanelly Mercury, whose editor W.B. Jones had himself been mentioned as a possible labour candidate.

Ward One

Ward Two

Ward Three

1901 election
At the seventh election in March 1901, two wards were contested, and in Ward 2, the editor of the Llanelly Mercury, whose candidacy had been canvassed the previous year, captured one of the seats.

Ward One

Ward Two

Ward Three

1902 election
The eighth election, held in 1902, was the first occasion upon which all wards were uncontested. W. Bramwell Jones was elected to the seat vacated by the death of John Allen Williams, editor of the Llanelly Guardian.

Ward One

Ward Two

Ward Three

1903 election
The ninth election, held in April 1903 saw a contest in one of the three wards. Two retiring members, namely John Griffiths (Ward 1) and Jeremiah Williams (Ward 2), both died shortly before the election. In Ward 3, the two official Liberal candidates prevailed.

Ward One

Ward Two

Ward Three

1904 election
At the tenth election in 1904, there were contests in Wards 1 and 2. Ernest Trubshaw, a member since the beginning, did not seek re-election while D.R. Edmunds switched from Ward 1 to Ward 2, where the editor of the Mercury, W.B. Jons, lost his seat. In Ward 3, John S. Tregoning jnr., a member of the council since its formation was one of two candidates returned unopposed.

Ward One

Ward Two

Ward Three

1905 election
The eleventh election was held in 1905, with the members in two wards being returned unopposed. In Ward 1, Joseph Maybery, a member of the Council since it was established, stood down at the last moment and the seat was won by a Trades and Labour Council candidate.

Ward One

Ward Two

Ward Three

1906 election
The twelfth election, held in April 1906 saw contests in all three wards.

Ward One

Ward Two

Ward Three

1907 election
The thirteenth elections saw contest in all wards and J.S. Tregoning, a member of the Council since its formation, lost his seat.

Ward One

Ward Two

Ward Three

1908 election
The fourteenth election saw contests in two wards.

Ward One

Ward Two

Ward Three

1909 election
The fifteenth election, held in April 1909 saw contests in Wards 2 and 3. Two sitting members lost their seats.

Ward One

Ward Two

Ward Three

References

Llanelli Borough Council elections
Llanelli